The 1987 Kansas State Wildcats football team represented Kansas State University in the 1987 NCAA Division I-A football season. The team's head football coach was Stan Parrish. The Wildcats played their home games in KSU Stadium.  They finished with a record of 0–10–1 overall and 0–6–1 in Big Eight Conference play. Kansas State scored 135 points and gave up 421 points.

Schedule

Personnel

Season summary

Austin Peay State

Army

at Iowa

Tulsa

at Missouri

Oklahoma

at Nebraska

Nebraska secured their 26th consecutive winning season, tying the NCAA record, and rolled up 459 rushing yards using 17 rushing players, while the Cornhusker defense prevented a touchdown for the third game in a row.

at Oklahoma State

Kansas

at Iowa State

Colorado

References

Kansas State
Kansas State Wildcats football seasons
College football winless seasons
Kansas State Wildcats football